The 1966 All-Atlantic Coast Conference football team consists of American football players chosen by various selectors for their All-Atlantic Coast Conference ("ACC") teams for the 1966 NCAA University Division football season. Selectors in 1966 included the Associated Press (AP).

All-Atlantic Coast Conference selections

Offensive selections

Ends
 Dave Dunaway, Duke (AP)
 Ed Carrington, Virginia (AP)

Offensive tackles
 Wayne Mass, Clemson (AP)
 Bill Gentry, NC State (AP)

Offensive guards
 Harry Olszewski, Clemson (AP)
 John Stec, NC State (AP)

Centers
 Bob Eplinger, Wake Forest (AP)

Backs
 Bob Davis, Virginia (AP)
 Gary Rowe, NC State (AP)
 Don DeArment, NC State (AP)
 Jimmy Addison, Clemson (AP)

Defensive selections

Defensive ends
 Butch Sursavage, Clemson (AP)
 Dick Absher, Maryland (AP)

Defensive tackles
 Dennis Byrd, NC State (AP)
 Robert Grant, Wake Forest (AP)

Middle guards
 Bob Foyle, Duke (AP)

Linebackers
 Bob Matheson, Duke (AP)
 Dave Everett, NC State (AP)

Defensive backs
 Bob Bryant, South Carolina (AP)
 Wayne Page, Clemson (AP)
 Art McMahon, NC State (AP)
 Andy Harper, Wake Forest (AP)

Key
AP = Associated Press

See also
1966 College Football All-America Team

References

All-Atlantic Coast Conference football team
All-Atlantic Coast Conference football teams